Irina Borysivna Ivshina (born 12 June 12, 1950, Perm, Russia ) is a  Russian microbiologist. She is head of the Laboratory of Alcanotrophic Microorganisms of the Institute of Ecology and Genetics of Microorganisms (IEGM).

She is a professor at the Perm State University. She is vice-president of the Russian Microbiological Society. She was an editor for Molecules.

Works

References

External links 

 
 ИЭГМ / Научные подразделения / Лаборатория алканотрофных микроорганизмов / Сотрудники / Ившина Ирина Борисовна (iegm.ru)

1950 births
People from Perm, Russia
Microbiologists
Living people
Russian women scientists